The Sophiornithidae (literally "wisdom birds") are an extinct family of chicken-sized predatory birds that lived from the Paleocene to the Eocene periods of the Cenozoic, and were found primarily in Europe, and are thought to be primitive owls.

The French genera Berruornis (Late Paleocene to Late Eocene/Early Oligocene), as well as Palaeotyto and Palaeobyas from Quercy, are sometimes placed in this family. The latter might instead be barn-owls, while the first might be a very basal owl but not an actual sophiornithid. Strigogyps was placed here for a time, but it has been revised several times since then and appears to be an ameghinornitid; these were distant relatives of the Seriemas.

References

Further reading
 Peters, Dieter Stefan (1987): Ein "Phorusrhacidae" aus dem Mittel-Eozän von Messel (Aves: Gruiformes: Cariamae). Documents des Laboratoires de Géologie de Lyon 99: 71–87. [Article in German]

Owls
Birds of prey
Prehistoric bird families
Paleocene first appearances
Eocene extinctions